Chuck Liebrock (born May 24, 1945) is a former professional Canadian football offensive lineman who played ten seasons in the Canadian Football League.

References 

1945 births
Living people
Canadian players of Canadian football
Canadian football offensive linemen
Toronto Argonauts players
Winnipeg Blue Bombers players
Hillsdale College alumni